Iconella is a genus of braconid wasps in the family Braconidae. There are about 38 described species in Iconella, found throughout most of the world.

Species
These 38 species belong to the genus Iconella:

 Iconella aeolus (Nixon, 1965)
 Iconella albinervis (Tobias, 1964)
 Iconella alfalfae (Nixon, 1960)
 Iconella andydeansi Fernández-Triana, 2013
 Iconella argante (Nixon, 1976)
 Iconella assabensis (Shenefelt, 1972)
 Iconella cajani (Wilkinson, 1928)
 Iconella canadensis Fernández-Triana, 2013
 Iconella compressiabdominis (You & Tong, 1991)
 Iconella detrectans (Wilkinson, 1928)
 Iconella etiellae (Viereck, 1911)
 Iconella fedtschenkoi (Kotenko, 1986)
 Iconella inula Papp, 2012
 Iconella isolata (Muesebeck, 1955)
 Iconella isus (Nixon, 1965)
 Iconella jason (Nixon, 1965)
 Iconella jayjayrodriguezae Fernández-Triana, 2013
 Iconella lacteoides (Nixon, 1965)
 Iconella lynceus (Nixon, 1965)
 Iconella masallensis (Abdinbekova, 1969)
 Iconella memorata Kotenko, 2007
 Iconella mera (Kotenko, 1992)
 Iconella merata (Kotenko, 1981)
 Iconella merula (Reinhard, 1880)
 Iconella meruloides (Nixon, 1965)
 Iconella mongashtensis Zargar & Gupta, 2019
 Iconella myeloenta (Wilkinson, 1937)
 Iconella nagyi (Papp, 1975)
 Iconella oppugnator (Papp, 1974)
 Iconella pyrene (Nixon, 1965)
 Iconella rudolphae (Kotenko, 1986)
 Iconella similus Zargar & Gupta, 2019
 Iconella subcamilla (Tobias, 1976)
 Iconella tedanius (Nixon, 1965)
 Iconella turanica (Telenga, 1955)
 Iconella valiko Kotenko, 2007
 Iconella verae (Tobias, 1976)
 Iconella vindicius (Nixon, 1965)

References

Further reading

 
 
 

Microgastrinae